Little Haystack Mountain is a peak on the Franconia Range of the White Mountains located in Grafton County, New Hampshire. It is flanked to the north by Mount Lincoln and to the southwest by Mount Liberty.

The Appalachian Trail, a  National Scenic Trail from Georgia to Maine, traverses Franconia Ridge, including Little Haystack.

The Falling Waters Trail is the most popular route up Little Haystack Mountain, leading  from U.S. Route 3 to the summit on the crest of Franconia Ridge. One of the most popular hikes in the Northeastern United States is to traverse the summits of Little Haystack, Lincoln, and Lafayette in a  loop.

See also

 List of mountains in New Hampshire
 White Mountain National Forest

References

Little Haystack Mountain
Little Haystack Mountain
Mountains on the Appalachian Trail